The 1868 Rangitikei by-election was a by-election held on 22 June 1868 in the  electorate during the 4th New Zealand Parliament.

The by-election was caused by the resignation of the incumbent MP William Hogg Watt on 15 June 1868.

The by-election was won by William Fox. As no other candidates were nominated, he was declared duly elected.

References

Rangitikei 1868
1868 elections in New Zealand
Politics of Rangitikei
June 1868 events